Olivia Poulet (born 9 July 1978) is an English actress and screenwriter.

Early life
Poulet was born in south-west London and attended Putney High School. She studied drama at Manchester University.

Career
After her graduation in 2001, Poulet landed her first role in the television series The Bill. In 2005,
she portrayed Camilla Parker Bowles, now the Queen Consort in the television film Whatever Love Means.
She appeared in the feature film In the Loop in 2009. The same year she portrayed Carol Thatcher in the television film Margaret. She has also had roles in Day of the Flowers, Sherlock, Dappers, The Thick of It, Reggie Perrin and Outnumbered.

Poulet has also appeared on stage productions including  The Queef of Terence and The Bird Flu Diaries. She has also voiced roles in video game Dragon Age II by BioWare.

Poulet is an ambassador of The Park Theatre. She appeared in Sarah Rutherford’s Adult Supervision, at the Park Theatre in Finsbury Park.

In 2018 she joined the cast of Holby City playing the hospital's new CEO Abigail Tate.

Filmography

Video games

References

External links

English television actresses
Living people
1978 births
Alumni of the University of Manchester
People educated at Putney High School
English film actresses
Actresses from London
21st-century English actresses
English screenwriters
British women screenwriters
English voice actresses
Writers from London
21st-century British screenwriters
21st-century English women writers